The 1969 NAIA World Series was the 13th annual tournament hosted by the National Association of Intercollegiate Athletics to determine the national champion of baseball among its member colleges and universities in the United States and Canada.

The tournament was played at Phil Welch Stadium in St. Joseph, Missouri.

William Carey (29-9) defeated La Verne (38-16) in the championship series, 5–3, to win the Crusaders' first NAIA World Series.

La Verne pitcher Steve Barber was named tournament MVP.

Bracket

See also
 1969 NCAA University Division baseball tournament
 1969 NCAA College Division baseball tournament

Reference

NAIA World Series
NAIA World Series
NAIA World Series